Armada Media Corporation is a Wisconsin-based media corporation founded in 2006 that owns radio stations in the Midwestern United States. Armada Media operates in small unrated markets. Armada Media is based in Fond du Lac and operates 28 radio stations and 2 translators in South Dakota, Wisconsin, the Upper Peninsula of Michigan, Nebraska, Kansas, Minnesota and Colorado.

Armada Media's Board of Directors includes former Wisconsin Governor Tommy Thompson, Terry Shockley, Chris Bernier, John Lynch, and Bob Bourke. Bernier also serves as the company's CEO. Investment banker Bob Bourke is the CFO. Jim Coursolle is the founder and former CEO of Armada, but resigned and left the company in March 2008.

Armada Media was sued by Wells Fargo Foothill Inc. in 2010 for defaulting on a $16.2 million loan.

Radio stations
Armada Media is the sole shareholder of radio station clusters based in McCook, Nebraska, and Michigan's Upper Peninsula.

Armada Media – McCook
Armada Media acquired High Plains Radio of McCook, Nebraska in 2007.

Armada Media – Escanaba
Armada Media acquired four stations from Radioactive, LLC on March 27, 2020.

Armada Media – Scottsbluff
Armada Media acquired Bluffs Broadcasting of Scottsbluff, Nebraska on May 1, 2013. The four stations were all subsequently sold to Nebraska Rural Radio Association effective January 17, 2020.

Armada Media – Watertown
Armada Media purchased four radio stations from Big Stone and Pheasant Country Broadcasting in 2007. The stations were all subsequently sold to Prairie Winds Broadcasting, Inc. effective August 30, 2019.

Previously-owned stations
 KBWS-FM (102.9 FM, Sisseton, SD)
 KDIO (1350 AM, Ortonville, MN)
 KETT (99.3 FM, Mitchell, NE)
 KHYY (106.9 FM, Scottsbluff, NE)
 KJKQ (99.5 FM, Sisseton, SD)
 KMOR (93.3 FM, Gering, NE)
 KMSD (1510 AM, Milbank, SD)
 KOAQ (1320 AM, Scottsbluff, NE)
 KOLT (690 AM, Terrytown, NE)
 KPHR (106.3 FM, Ortonville, MN)
 K252FB (98.3 FM, Milbank, SD)

References

External links
Official website

American radio networks
Companies based in Wisconsin
Mass media companies established in 2006
Radio broadcasting companies of the United States